is a Chinese-Japanese voice actress affiliated with I'm Enterprise. She is best known for voicing Syuko Shiomi in The Idolmaster Cinderella Girls video game and Rishuri Maezono in Tokyo 7th Sisters.

Biography and career
Ru Thing was born in the People's Republic of China on 21 December 1993 and was raised in Osaka Prefecture and educated at the Japan Narration Actor Institute.

Her voice acting career began in 2013, and she was cast as Rishuri Maezono in the Tokyo 7th Sisters rhythm game. In 2015, she was cast as Syuko Shiomi in The Idolmaster Cinderella Girls, and her character single, which features the song Ao no Ichibanhoshi, was released on 18 November 2015. It charted on the Oricon Singles Chart for 19 weeks and topped at #13 on 30 November. Syuko Shiomi also appeared in the series' first album to top the Oricon Albums Chart, Cute jewelries! 003, and in the second season of the Cinderella Girls anime adaptation.

In anime, she has had minor roles in Love Live! Sunshine!!, Oreshura, and The Morose Mononokean.

Filmography

Anime
2013
Oreshura, schoolgirl
2015
The Idolmaster Cinderella Girls season 2, Syuko Shiomi
2016
The Morose Mononokean, schoolgirl
Love Live! Sunshine!!, schoolgirl

Video games
2019
Arknights: Firewatch, Haze

References

1993 births
Living people
Chinese emigrants to Japan
I'm Enterprise voice actors
Japanese video game actresses
Japanese voice actresses
Voice actresses from Osaka Prefecture
21st-century Japanese actresses
21st-century Japanese women singers
21st-century Japanese singers